Qarah Qeshlaq (also Romanized as Qarah Qeshlāq and Qareh Qeshlāq) is a village in Lakestan Rural District of the Central District of Salmas County, West Azerbaijan province, Iran. At the 2006 National Census, its population was 2,126 in 552 households. The following census in 2011 counted 2,256 people in 628 households. The latest census in 2016 showed a population of 2,040 people in 647 households; it was the largest village in its rural district.

References 

Salmas County

Populated places in West Azerbaijan Province

Populated places in Salmas County